Pool B of the First Round of the 2013 World Baseball Classic was held at Intercontinental Baseball Stadium, Taichung, Taiwan from March 2 to 5, 2013.

Pool B was a round-robin tournament. Each team played the other three teams once, with the top two teams advancing to Pool 1.

Standings

Pool B MVP:  Dai-Kang Yang

Results
All times are Taiwan National Standard Time (UTC+08:00).

Chinese Taipei 4, Australia 1

Netherlands 5, South Korea 0

The Netherlands earned their first win against 2009 finalists South Korea. South Korea committed four errors while accumulating a run deficit in the pool that would eventually lead to their elimination on tiebreakers.

Chinese Taipei 8, Netherlands 3

Overcoming an early deficit, Chinese Taipei scored a convincing win over the Netherlands, putting it into a commanding position as it went into the pool's final game against South Korea.

South Korea 6, Australia 0

Netherlands 4, Australia 1

The Netherlands took an early lead and did not relinquish it.  With the win, the Netherlands clinched at least a three-way tie for the two second-round berths, and its favorable position with respect to tiebreakers meant that it was assured of advancing regardless of the outcome of the final game between Chinese Taipei and South Korea.

South Korea 3, Chinese Taipei 2

South Korea went into the final game needing not only to win (which would cause a three-way tie for the two second-round berths) but to win by at least five runs in order to have a chance of advancing on tiebreakers.  Although Chinese Taipei lost its 2−0 lead in Korea's three-run eighth-inning rally, and then lost the game, they emerged as winners of the pool and of the second-round berth since Korea's margin of victory was only one run.

See also
 List of sporting events in Taiwan

References

External links
Official website

Pool B
World Baseball Classic Pool B
International baseball competitions hosted by Taiwan
World Baseball Classic Pool B
Sport in Taichung